The Char Dham (meaning: four abodes) is a set of four pilgrimage sites in India. It is believed that visiting these sites helps achieve moksha (salvation). The four Dhams are, Badrinath, Dwarka, Puri and Rameswaram. It is believed that every Hindu should visit the Char Dhams during one's lifetime. The Char Dham as defined by Adi Shankaracharya consists of four Hindu pilgrimage sites. 
These main 'dhamas' are the shrines of Lord Vishnu and Rameshwaram is a shrine of lord Shiva.
All the 'dhamas' are related to four epochs,(1) Dham of Satyuga- Badrinath, Uttarakhand (2) Dham of Tretayuga -Rameswaram, Tamil Nadu (3) Dham of Dwaparayuga - Dvaraka, Gujarat (4) Dham of Kaliyuga - Jagannatha Puri, Odisha.

Another small circuit in Uttarakhand of four pilgrimage sites-Yamunotri, Gangotri, Kedarnath, and Badrinath is referred to as Chota Char Dham which is locally popular in North India.

Description

According to Hindu belief, Badrinath became prominent when Nara-Narayana, an avatar of Vishnu, did Tapasya there. At that time that place was filled with berry trees. In the Sanskrit language, berries are called "badri", so the place was named Badrika-Vana, i.e. the forest of berries. The particular spot where the Nara-Narayana did Tapasya, a large berry tree formed covering him to save him from the rain and the sun. Local people believe that Mata Lakshmi became the berry tree to save Lord Narayana. Post-Tapasya, Narayana said, people will always take Her Name before His Name, hence Hindus always refer "Lakshmi-Narayana". It was therefore called Badri-Nath, i.e. the Lord of Berry forest. This all happened in the Satya Yuga. So Badrinath came to be known as the first Dhama.

The second place, Rameswaram, got its importance in the Treta Yuga when Lord Rama built a Shiva-Lingam here and worshiped it to get the blessings of Lord Shiva. The name Rameswaram means "God of Rama". It is also believed that Bhagwan Ram footprints are imprinted there. NV.

The third, Dwaraka, got its importance in the Dvapara Yuga when Lord Krishna made Dwaraka His residence instead of Mathura, His birthplace.

At the fourth, Puri, Lord Vishnu is worshiped as Jagannatha, his Avtara for the current epoch i.e Kali Yuga.

The four Shankaracharya Peetha (Seats) at the Char Dham school of Hinduism, created at least four Hindu monastic institutions. He organised the Hindu practitioners under four  (institutions/monasteries), with the headquarters at Dvārakā in the West, Jagannatha Puri in the East, Sringeri Sharada Peetham in the South and Badrikashrama in the North.

The table below gives an overview of the four Amnaya Mathas founded by Adi Shankara, and their details.

The four associated places of the Char Dham
In the Puranas Hari (Vishnu) and Hara (Shiva) are referred as eternal friends. It is said wherever Lord Vishnu resides, Lord Shiva resides nearby. The Char Dham follows this rule. So Kedarnath is considered as the pair of Badrinath, Rama Setu is considered the pair of Rameswaram, Somnath is considered as the pair of Dwaraka and Lingaraja is considered the pair of Jagannatha Puri. However, according to some traditions, the Char Dham are Badrinath, Ranganatha-Swami, Dwaraka and Jagannatha-Puri, all of which are Vaishnava sites, and their associated places are Kedarnath, Rameswaram, Somnath and Lingaraja Temple, Bhubaneswar (or maybe Gupteshwar) respectively.

The Char Dham Highway project is functional, many service providers offer a Char Dham Yatra by helicopter for the ease of pilgrims.

Puri 

Puri located at the east, is located in the state of Odisha, India. Puri is one of the oldest cities in the eastern part of the country. It is situated on the coast of the Bay of Bengal. The main deity is Shri Krishna, celebrated as Lord Jagannatha. It is the only shrine in India, where goddess, Subhadra, sister of Lord Krishna is worshipped along with her brothers, Lord Jagannatha and Lord Balabhadra. The main temple here is about 1000 years old and constructed by Raja Choda Ganga Deva and Raja Tritiya Ananga Bhima Deva. Puri is the site of the Govardhana Matha, one of the four cardinal institutions or Mathas converted by Adi Shankaracharya. Pandit Nilakantha Das suggested that Jagannath was a deity of Jain origin because of the appending of Nath to many Jain Tirthankars.  Jagannath meant the 'World personified' in the Jain context and was derived from Jinanath. Evidence of the Jain terminology such as of Kaivalya, which means moksha or salvation, is found in the Jagannath tradition. Similarly, the twenty two steps leading to the temple, called the Baisi Pahacha, have been proposed as symbolic reverence for the first 22 of the 24 Tirthankaras of Jainism.

According to Annirudh Das, the original Jagannath deity was influenced by Jainism and is none other than the Jina of Kalinga taken to Magadha by Mahapadma Nanda. The theory of Jain origins is supported by the Jain Hathigumpha inscription. It mentions the worship of a relic memorial in Khandagiri-Udayagiri, on the Kumara hill. This location is stated to be same as the Jagannath temple site. However, states Starza, a Jain text mentions the Jagannath shrine was restored by Jains, but the authenticity and date of this text is unclear. This is the plume for Oriya people to celebrate a special day in this Dham which is known as Ratha Yatra ("Chariot Festival").

Rameswaram

Indian peninsula. According to legends, this is the place where Lord Ram along with his brother Laxman and devotee Hanuman built a bridge (Rama Setu) to reach Sri Lanka to rescue his wife Sita who had been abducted earlier by Ravan, the ruler of Sri Lanka. The Ramanatha Swamy Temple dedicated to Lord Shiva occupies a major area of Rameswaram. The temple is believed to have been consecrated by Shri Rama Chandra. Rameswaram is significant for the Hindus as a pilgrimage to Benaras is incomplete without a pilgrimage to Rameswaram. The presiding deity here is in the form of a Linga with the name Sri Ramanatha Swamy, it also is one of the twelve Jyotirlingas.

Dwarka 

Dwarka located in the west is in the state of Gujarat, country India. The city derives its name from the word "dvar" meaning door or gate in the Sanskrit language. It is located confluence to where the Gomti River merges into the Arabian Sea. However, this river Gomti is not the same Gomti River which is a tributary of Ganga River The city lies in the westernmost part of India. The legendary city of Dvārakā was the dwelling place of Lord Krishna. It is generally believed that due to damage and destruction by the sea, Dvārakā had submerged six times and modern day Dwarka is the 7th such city to be built in the area.

Badrinath

Badrinath is located in the state of Uttarakhand. It is in the Garhwal hills, on the banks of the Alaknanda River. The town lies between the Nar and Narayana mountain ranges and in the shadow of Nilkantha peak (6,560 m). 
There are other interesting sightseeing spots like Mana, Vyas Gufa, Maatamoorti, Charanpaduka, Bhimkund and the Mukh of the Saraswati River, within 3 km of Badrinathjee. Joshimath is situated on the slopes above the confluence of the rivers Alaknanda and Dhauliganga. Of the four Maths established by Adi Shankaracharya, Joshimath is the winter seat of Chardham.

While the three other Dhams remain open throughout the year, Badrinath Dham only remains open for pilgrims' darshan from April to October each year.

Chota Char Dham
Another circuit of four ancient pilgrimage sites in the Indian state of Uttarakhand viz. Yamunotri, Gangotri, Kedarnath, and Badrinath is referred to as Chota Char Dham to differentiate it from this bigger circuit of Char Dham sites. The Chota Char Dham shrines are closed in winter due to snowfall and reopen for pilgrims with the advent of summer.

Brief about  Chardham Temples :-

1. Yamunotri :- The first shrine of Chota Chardham, this temple is dedicated to the River Yamuna (Hindu Goddess, daughter of Sun God). It is situated in the Gharwal region of Uttarakhand State.

2. Gangotri :- The temple is devoted to Goddess Ganges (the most sacred river in India). It is the second shrine of the  Char Dham circuit.

3. Kedarnath :- This temple is devoted to God Shiva in the form of Kedarnath (Lord of Kedar). This is one of the 12 main Jyotirlinga in India. This is the third shrine of the  Char Dham circuit.

4. Badrinath:- This temple is dedicated to Bhagwan Vishnu in the form of Badrinath (Lord of Badri). It is also the part of the main Char Dham Circuit in India and the fourth shrine of the  Chardham circuit.

On 23 December 2016, the Indian Prime Minister Shri Narendra Modi  inaugurated the Chardham Rajmarg Vikas Pariyojana ("Char Dham Highway Development Project") to improve connectivity between Gangotri, Yamunotri, Kedarnath and Badrinath making pilgrimages visit easier.

See also
 Chota Char Dham
 Sapta Puri
 Jyotirlinga
 Famous Hindu yatras
 Hindu pilgrimage sites in India
 List of Hindu festivals
 Padayatra
 Ratha Yatra
 Tirtha
 Tirtha and Kshetra
 Chari Kshetra

References

External links 
 

Hindu pilgrimage sites in India
Religious tourism in India
Char Dham temples
Hindu holy cities
Hindu pilgrimages
Krishna
Krishna temples
Rama temples